Leatherman is an American brand of multitools and knives made by Leatherman Tool Group of Portland, Oregon. The company was founded in July 1983 by Timothy S. Leatherman and Steve Berliner in order to market his idea of a capable, easily portable hand tool with multiple functions. That same year, Leatherman sold the first multitool, which was called the PST (Pocket Survival Tool).

Company history
Timothy S. Leatherman, a 1970 mechanical engineering graduate of Oregon State University, and his business partner, Steve Berliner, formed Leatherman Tool Group in 1983.

Leatherman was inspired to design a "Boy Scout knife with pliers" while he and his wife traveled Europe and the Middle East in 1975, often attempting to use a simple pocketknife to repair both their aged and repeatedly malfunctioning Italian Fiat 600 car (bought in Amsterdam for $300) and leaky hotel plumbing. He spent several years perfecting the "Mr. Crunch" prototype and received his first U.S. patent (4,238,862) in 1980. After additional refinement, Leatherman's first product was introduced in 1983 as the Pocket Survival Tool (PST) and initially sold through Early Winters' and Cabela's mail-order catalogs.

Leatherman sold nearly 30,000 tools in 1984, fueling additional product development, and rapid growth both in the company and manufacturing capacity. By the end of 2001, the company had sales of $100 million annually and had sold more than 20 million tools.

Folding knives were introduced into the Leatherman product line in 2005. In 2007, the company opened its first retail store, located at its manufacturing facility, that has since relocated to a retail store at the Cascade Station shopping center near the facility and Cascades MAX Station in Northeast Portland, Oregon. The same year, Tim Leatherman was inducted into the Blade magazine Cutlery Hall of Fame in recognition of his design impact on the cutlery history.

In 2011, the Leatherman Tool Group acquired German light manufacturer, Ledlenser. The brands and companies were run separately, under the Leatherman Tool Group, Inc. umbrella. Leatherman Tool Group also manufactures a line of multi-tools designed specifically for military and law enforcement personnel, as well as accessories for carrying and expanding the function of its tools.
, Leatherman produced 50 products sold in 82 countries, with U.S. market share estimated at 55 percent.

Leatherman has a sponsorship deal with the Major League Soccer team Portland Timbers. Specifically, the company is the shirt sponsor for the team's mascot, "Timber Joey".

Products
Leatherman's primary products are multi-tools and knives. Most Leatherman multi-tools are built around a pair of pliers, with up to 21 additional tools stored in the handles, including knives (straight and serrated blades), screwdrivers (flat, Phillips), saws, wire cutters and strippers, electrical crimper, bottle opener, and can opener. Most models have a built-in safety mechanism that locks the active tool in the open position when fully unfolded. Models range in weight from the 0.81 ounce (23 g) Style to the 12.5 ounce (335 g) Surge.

Leatherman currently produces folding knives under the Crater name. Models range from two tools (knife blade and carabiner/bottle opener) to four (blade, carabiner/bottle opener, flat, and Phillips screwdrivers).

See also 
 Gerber multitool
 Victorinox
 Wenger

References

External links 

 
 Portland Business Journal: Leatherman learns patent lessons the hard way

Knife manufacturing companies
Multi-tool manufacturers
Pliers
Camping equipment
Manufacturing companies established in 1983
Privately held companies based in Oregon
Manufacturing companies based in Portland, Oregon
Goods manufactured in the United States
1983 establishments in Oregon
American brands
Tool manufacturing companies of the United States